Pride Group is a vertical organisation engaged in the manufacture and export of knitwear products to the European Union, the US and Canada. 

The group is also engaged in the manufacture and retail of womenswear, menswear, kidswear, home decor and other textile products through a chain of 60 retail outlets spread all over Bangladesh.

Early years 

Pride Group began its journey in 1958, when founder Halimur Rahman first established Dacca Textiles, and laid the foundation to what would eventually become Pride Limited. At the time of Dacca Textiles' inception, Rahman was employed in EPSCIC, and it is from this that he arrived at the idea of establishing a garment factory that would supply locally made saris for the women of Bangladesh.

Board of directors

Mohammad Abdul Moyeed (Managing Director),
Dr. Mohammad Abdul Moyeen (Director) and
Mohammad Abdul Momen (Director), sons of Halimur Rahman, compose the current board of Pride Group.

H.R. Textiles Mills Limited

H.R. Textiles Mills Limited is a vertical public limited company, engaged in manufacture of knitwear products. H.R. Textiles Mills is a Lycra assured factory. Zara, Bershka, New Look, Stradivarius, and El Corte Inglés are some of their clients.

Fashion Knit Garments Limited is engaged in manufacturing knitwear products, consisting of ladies tops, sports and active wear, children outerwear, and men's innerwear.

Dacca Textiles Limited

Dacca Textiles is involved in the manufacturing and processing of woven textiles. It is one of the oldest textile processors in Bangladesh.

Pride Limited

Pride Limited, in its present form, started with the setting up of a retail outlet at TMC Bhaban in 1991. Pride Limited was previously known as Pride Textiles.

Product range

Better known for its saris and other textile products, Pride Limited product lines range from Pride Signature, Pride Girls, Ethnic Menswear, Pride Kids and Pride Home Textiles.

Urban Truth

Launched in 2010, Urban Truth specifically targets the younger segment of Dhaka society.

Product range

Fast fashion and culturally relevant, trend-setting styles for millennials and Generation Z.

References
 [The Daily Star – http://www.thedailystar.net/pages.php?id=05&date=2011-02-21 Taking pride in a brand, Monday 21 February 2011]
 Pride dazzles with High Fashion
 Pride Offers new products, The News Today, Sunday 9 October 2005
 Pride opens new branch in Banani, New Age Timeout, Sunday 9 October 2005
 Baishakh with Pride, Sanam Amin, X8, New Age Glitz, Friday 11 April 2008
 Pride Eid Collection 2006, Cover Story, Sanam Amin, Trends magazine, Tuesday 5 September 2006
 Pride Textiles is a Bigger Family Now, Cover Story, Page 7, Family and Style, JaiJaiDin, Friday 1 September 2006
 New Age Eid Fashion 2005
 Snazzy, Jazzy Pride, Page 4, Probe News magazine, Vol.5 Issue 10, September 2006
 Pride Textiles-Trends and Tradition
 The Daily Star article
 Probe News Magazine article
 Baishakh with Pride
 Lifestyle
 Participant List of Dhaka Intl. Trade fair 2008
 H.R. Textiles on the CSE
 Dacca Textiles Limited
The New York Times: CounterSourcing Inc. and Pride Group
The Daily Star-Aromatic Gold Dhaka Fashion Week 2008
M. A. Momen, member of Advisory Board of Pearl fashion Institute
HR Textile okays 5pc dividend
Tint of glamour
Pride Fall Collection 2009 at DFW 2009
Pride in the Times Of India
Pride in New Age DFW 2009 heats up the runway
Pride in New Age's Timeout
Urban Truth in Bhorer Kagoj, 13 February 2011
Urban Truth in Lifestyle, 2 February 2011
MODA in Lifestyle, 4 August 2010
"Taking Pride In a Brand", The Daily Star, 21 February 2011
 Couture Conundrum by Sabrina F Ahmed, Lifestyle, 2 October 2012
"World Brand Congress: Award Winners 2014"

Textile companies of Bangladesh
Companies based in Dhaka